Pseudotelphusa sokolovae is a moth of the family Gelechiidae. It is found in Tajikistan.

References

Moths described in 1971
Pseudotelphusa